Protocruziea is a class of ciliates in the subphylum Intramacronucleata.

References 

Intramacronucleata
Monotypic SAR supergroup taxa
Ciliate classes